Lysophosphatidic acid receptor 4 also known as LPA4 is a protein that in humans is encoded by the LPAR4 gene. LPA4 is a G protein-coupled receptor that binds the lipid signaling molecule lysophosphatidic acid (LPA).

See also
 Lysophospholipid receptor
 P2Y receptor

References

Further reading

G protein-coupled receptors